Varun Grover may refer to:

 Varun Grover (information scientist) (born 1959), American academic
 Varun Grover (writer) (born 1980), Indian songwriter